The 1997 Arkansas State Indians football team represented Arkansas State University as an independent during the 1997 NCAA Division I-A football season. Led by first-year head coach Joe Hollis, the Indians compiled a record of 2–9.

Schedule

References

Arkansas State
Arkansas State Red Wolves football seasons
Arkansas State Indians football